The 2022 Masters Tournament was the 86th edition of the Masters Tournament, the first of the four major golf championships of 2022, held April 7–10 at the Augusta National Golf Club in Augusta, Georgia.

For the first time since the 2019 tournament, attendance returned to full capacity with maximum of 40,000 spectators per day; the traditional par-3 contest also returned.

Scottie Scheffler won his first major by three strokes over Rory McIlroy. Scheffler had achieved his first PGA Tour win at the WM Phoenix Open two months earlier, and after also winning the Arnold Palmer Invitational and WGC-Dell Technologies Match Play he entered the Masters as world number one.

Scheffler led by a record-tying five strokes after the second round, and held the lead from then on. His main challenger was Cameron Smith, who narrowed the lead to one stroke after the second hole of the final round. On the subsequent hole, Scheffler and Smith found themselves in the same tricky position, with Scheffler chipping in for a birdie, and Smith only managing a bogey, extending the lead to 3 strokes. Smith made a triple bogey on the 12th hole after his ball went into the water, leaving Scheffler relatively unchallenged for the rest of the round. 

Entering the final round 10 strokes back from Scheffler, Rory McIlroy shot a 8-under-par 64 to finish second, his best major finish since 2014. Much attention was given to Tiger Woods, who made his first PGA Tour start since the 2020 Masters after suffering severe injuries to his right leg and ankle in a February 2021 car accident. Woods made the cut and finished the tournament 47th, visibly limping for much of the last two rounds. Defending champion Hideki Matsuyama finished tied for 14th.

There was no winner of the Silver Cup (prize for low amateur), as no amateur made the cut. This year's purse was increased over thirty percent to $15 million, with a winner's share of $2.7 million.

Course

Field
Participation in the Masters Tournament is by invitation only, and the tournament has the smallest field of the major championships. There are a number of criteria by which invites were awarded, including all past winners, recent major champions, leading finishers in the previous years' majors, leading players on the PGA Tour in the previous season, winners of full-point tournaments on the PGA Tour during the previous 12 months, leading players in the Official World Golf Ranking and some leading amateurs.

Criteria
This list details the qualification criteria for the 2022 Masters Tournament and the players who qualified under them; any additional criteria under which players qualified is indicated in parentheses.

1. All past winners of the Masters Tournament

Fred Couples
Sergio García (17,18,19)
Dustin Johnson (17,18,19)
Zach Johnson
Bernhard Langer
Sandy Lyle
Hideki Matsuyama (12,16,17,18,19)
Larry Mize
José María Olazábal
Patrick Reed (12,17,18,19)
Charl Schwartzel
Adam Scott (18,19)
Vijay Singh
Jordan Spieth (3,12,14,17,18,19)
Bubba Watson
Mike Weir
Danny Willett
Tiger Woods

Past winners not playing: Tommy Aaron, Jack Burke Jr., Ángel Cabrera, Charles Coody, Ben Crenshaw, Nick Faldo, Raymond Floyd, Trevor Immelman, Phil Mickelson (4,15,16,18,19), Jack Nicklaus, Mark O'Meara, Gary Player, Craig Stadler, Tom Watson, Ian Woosnam, Fuzzy Zoeller

2. Recent winners of the U.S. Open (2017–2021)

Bryson DeChambeau (17,18,19)
Brooks Koepka (4,13,15,17,18,19)
Jon Rahm (12,13,14,16,17,18,19)
Gary Woodland

3. Recent winners of The Open Championship (2017–2021)

Shane Lowry (15,18,19)
Francesco Molinari
Collin Morikawa (4,13,14,16,17,18,19)

4. Recent winners of the PGA Championship (2017–2021)

Justin Thomas (5,12,17,18,19)

5. Recent winners of The Players Championship (2020–2022)

Cameron Smith (12,16,17,18,19)

6. The winner of the gold medal at the Olympic Games

Xander Schauffele (12,17,18,19)

7. The winner and runner-up in the 2021 U.S. Amateur Championship

Austin Greaser (a)
James Piot (a)

8. The winner of the 2021 Amateur Championship

Laird Shepherd (a)

9. The winner of the 2021 Asia-Pacific Amateur Championship

Keita Nakajima (a)

10. The winner of the 2022 Latin America Amateur Championship

Aaron Jarvis (a)

11. The winner of the 2021 U.S. Mid-Amateur Golf Championship

Stewart Hagestad (a)

12. The leading 12 players, and those tying for 12th place, from the 2021 Masters Tournament

Stewart Cink (16,17)
Corey Conners (17,18,19)
Tony Finau (16,17,18,19)
Brian Harman 
Kim Si-woo 
Marc Leishman (18,19)
Robert MacIntyre
Kevin Na (17,18,19)
Justin Rose (18)
Webb Simpson (18,19)
Will Zalatoris (18,19)

13. The leading four players, and those tying for fourth place, in the 2021 U.S. Open

Guido Migliozzi
Louis Oosthuizen (14,15,17,18,19)

Harris English (16,17,18,19) did not play due to an injury.

14. The leading four players, and those tying for fourth place, in the 2021 Open Championship

15. The leading four players, and those tying for fourth place, in the 2021 PGA Championship

Pádraig Harrington
Harry Higgs

Paul Casey (18,19) did not play due to an injury.

16. Winners of PGA Tour events between the 2021
Masters Tournament and the 2022 Masters Tournament

Abraham Ancer (17,18,19)
Sam Burns (17,18,19)
Patrick Cantlay (17,18,19)
Cameron Champ
Cameron Davis
Lucas Glover
Talor Gooch (18,19)
Lucas Herbert (18,19)
Garrick Higgo
Tom Hoge (19)
Max Homa (18,19)
Viktor Hovland (17,18,19)
Im Sung-jae (17,18,19)
Kevin Kisner (18,19)
Jason Kokrak (17,18,19)
Lee Kyoung-hoon
Luke List
Rory McIlroy (17,18,19)
Joaquín Niemann (17,18,19)
Scottie Scheffler (17,18,19)
J. J. Spaun
Sepp Straka
Hudson Swafford

17. All players who qualified for the 2021 Tour Championship

Daniel Berger (18,19)
Billy Horschel (18,19)
Erik van Rooyen

18. The leading 50 players on the Official World Golf Ranking as of December 31, 2021

Christiaan Bezuidenhout
Matt Fitzpatrick (19)
Tommy Fleetwood (19)
Tyrrell Hatton (19)
Mackenzie Hughes
Takumi Kanaya (19)
Min Woo Lee
Ryan Palmer
Lee Westwood
Matthew Wolff (19)

19. The leading 50 players on the Official World Golf Ranking as of March 28, 2022

Russell Henley
Thomas Pieters
Séamus Power
Harold Varner III
Cameron Young

20. Invited international players
 None

Par 3 contest
Wednesday, April 6, 2022

The Par-3 contest was held for the first time since 2019. Play was halted at 3:44 pm ET with 26 players still on the course. Mike Weir and Mackenzie Hughes, co-leaders at four-under, were declared co-champions. Jason Kokrak recorded the only hole-in-one on the fourth hole.

Weather
Thursday: Mostly sunny with morning thunderstorms. Due to thunderstorms, all starting times were delayed 30 minutes. 

Friday: Mostly sunny.

Saturday: Cloudy.

Sunday: Sunny. Wind W .

Round summaries

First round
Thursday, April 7, 2022

Im Sung-jae became the first Korean player to hold the lead after a round at the Masters following a five-under-par 67. Im birdied his first three holes and was four-under after seven holes before consecutive bogeys on holes 10 and 11. At the par-5 13th, Im hit his approach shot to 12 feet and made the putt for eagle before also birdieing the par-5 15th to take sole possession of the lead.

Cameron Smith, who finished tied for second with Im in 2020, opened with a double-bogey at the first hole. Beginning with a chip-in for birdie at the fifth, however, Smith went eight-under-par over a span of 14 holes. At the par-3 16th, Smith hit his tee shot to five feet and made the putt to get to six-under for the round before another double-bogey on the 18th dropped him back to four-under and a round of 68.

Scottie Scheffler, playing his first tournament as World No. 1, did not make a bogey until the 18th hole in a 3-under-par round of 69. He was in a group tied for third place that also included past champions Dustin Johnson and Danny Willett, as well as Joaquín Niemann, who holed out for an eagle on the par-4 ninth hole.

Harold Varner III, in his Masters debut, went four-under-par in a 4-hole stretch from the 13th to the 16th hole, including a near albatross from the pine straw at the 13th. He finished with a one-under-par 71.

Tiger Woods was playing in his first tournament since the 2020 Masters and opened with a one-under-par 71, tied for 10th place after 18 holes. Defending champion Hideki Matsuyama shot an ever-par 72.

Overnight rain meant that the start was delayed by 30 minutes; the first players teeing off at 8:30 a.m. local time.

Second round
Friday, April 8, 2022

World No. 1 Scottie Scheffler added a five-under-par round of 67 to his first round 69, for an aggregate score of 136, 8-under-par. Four players, including first-round leader Im Sung-jae and defending champion Hideki Matsuyama, were in second place. Scheffler's five-stroke lead tied the 36-hole tournament record, with 4 of the 5 previous record holders going on to win.

Tiger Woods shot a 74, and had an aggregate score of 145, one-over-par, was tied for 19th place and nine strokes behind the leader. Stewart Cink made a hole-in-one at the par-3 16th hole.

52 players made the cut of 148, 4-over-par. None of the six amateurs made the cut. Other notable players to miss the cut include 2015 Masters champion Jordan Spieth, 2019 Masters runner-ups Brooks Koepka and Xander Schauffele, and 2020 U.S. Open champion Bryson DeChambeau.

Third round
Saturday, April 9, 2022

Scottie Scheffler, beginning the round with a five-shot lead, made four birdies on the front-nine to get to 11-under and open a six-shot advantage at the turn. On the par-3 12th hole, Scheffler hit his tee shot into the bunker in front of the green and had his second roll over the green, leading to a bogey. After an up-and-down for birdie on the par-5 13th, his approach on the 14th spun off the green and led to another bogey. He found the green on the par-5 15th hole in three shots but three-putted for his third bogey over his last four holes.

With his lead now cut to just three shots, Scheffler played his approach on the 17th to five feet and made the birdie to get back to 10-under. At the 18th, he was forced to take a drop from underneath a tree after a drive well to the left, but was able to hit his third shot from the pine straw over the green and salvage a bogey to finish at nine-under following a round of 71.

Cameron Smith began the round six shots behind but went five-under from the sixth to 15th holes. Despite a bogey at the par-3 16th after failing to get up-and-down from a greenside bunker, Smith shot a four-under 68, the best round of the day by two shots, to finish at six-under, three behind Scheffler.

First-round leader Im Sung-jae double-bogeyed his first hole and was four-over through six holes, but played the remainder of his round in five-under to finish with a 71 and jump up to solo third place at four-under. 2011 champion Charl Schwartzel, playing in the final group with Scheffler, holed out from the fairway on the 10th for an eagle to get within three of the lead but made four bogeys over his final eight holes to drop back to two-under, tied for fourth with Shane Lowry.

Five-time champion Tiger Woods had four three-putts and a four-putt, his first in this tournament since 2005, in a six-over round of 78, the worst score of his career at the Masters.

Final round
Sunday, April 10, 2022

Summary

Scottie Scheffler shot a one-under round of 71 to win his first Masters and major championship by three shots. 

Scheffler began the final round with a three-shot lead but saw his advantage cut to one after Cameron Smith birdied his first two holes. Both players missed their drives left on the par-4 third hole and came up short on their second shots. Scheffler, playing first, hit a low shot that rolled into the hole for a birdie. Smith chipped past the hole and missed his par putt to fall back to three behind. Smith also bogeyed the par-3 fourth from the front greenside bunker. They both birdied the seventh after close approaches and Scheffler made the turn with a four-shot lead at 11-under.

On the 10th, Smith hooked his drive well left and was forced to pitch back out into the fairway, then missed a close putt for par. Scheffler, meanwhile, was in the middle of the fairway off the tee but hit his approach off the green to the left and failed to get up-and down. When Smith birdied the 11th hole by making a 15-foot putt, only the second birdie on the hole during the round, he cut the deficit to three heading to the 12th.

Smith's approach on the par-3 12th came up short and landed in Rae's Creek. Taking a drop and now playing his third shot, he hit over the green and ended up with a triple-bogey to fall out of contention. Scheffler also missed the green with his tee shot but was able to scramble and save par. After laying up on the par-5 13th and making par, Scheffler knocked his approach on 14 to five feet and made another birdie to get to 11-under. He also got up-and-down from over the green on the par-5 15th to increase his lead to five.

Rory McIlroy began the round 10 shots behind Scheffler before making four birdies on his front-nine. He then chipped in for birdie from over the green on the 10th, eagled the par-5 13th, and holed a shot from a greenside bunker on the 18th to shoot 64 (−8), tying a Masters record for the lowest final-round score. He finished at seven-under and moved up to solo second place, his best finish at the Masters. McIlroy shot the only bogey-free round of any player during the tournament in his final round.

With a five-shot lead playing 18th, Scheffler missed a birdie putt from the top shelf of the green, then missed two short putts and tapped in for double-bogey to finish at 10-under, three ahead of McIlroy. Smith recovered from another bogey on the 14th with two straight birdies on the 15th and 16th to finish at five-under and in a tie for third with Shane Lowry.

Final leaderboard

Scorecard

Cumulative tournament scores, relative to par
{|class="wikitable" span = 50 style="font-size:85%;
|-
|  style="background:Red;  width:10px;"|
|Eagle
|  style="background:Pink; width:10px;"|
|Birdie
|  style="background:PaleGreen; width:10px;"|
|Bogey
|    style="background:Green; width:10px;"|
|Double bogey
|    style="background:Olive; width:10px;"|
|Triple bogey+
|}

Aftermath

Reaction from Scheffler
As is traditional, Scheffler was interviewed in Butler Cabin, where he discussed his victory:

"The shot on 3 was not one I expected to go in. It didn’t change the complexion of the day but it definitely got things rolling for me and I played some good golf after that. I can’t put into words what it means to be able to come back here for a lifetime. We’re going to go home and celebrate a little bit. I’m kind of glad I had a little hiccup on the last hole that made me a little less emotional so I can get through this interview!"

Notes

References

External links

2022
2022 in golf
2022 in American sports
2022 in sports in Georgia (U.S. state)
April 2022 sports events in the United States